Emil Andrei Răducu (born 19 May 1984), is a Romanian futsal player who plays for Balzan as a Defender.

References

External links
LNFS profile
UEFA profile
Futsalplanet profile

1984 births
Living people
Romanian men's futsal players